ASASSN-19bt is a tidal disruption event, a star destroyed by a black hole, discovered by the All Sky Automated Survey for SuperNovae (ASAS-SN) project, with early-time, detailed observations by the TESS satellite.  It was first detected on January 21, 2019, and reached peak brightness on March 4.  The black hole is in the 16th magnitude galaxy 2MASX J07001137-6602251 in the constellation Volans at a redshift of 0.0262, around 375 million light years away.

Observations in UV light made with NASA's Neil Gehrels Swift Observatory showed a drop in the temperature of the tidal disruption from around 71,500 to 35,500 degrees Fahrenheit (40,000 to 20,000 degrees Celsius) over a few days. This is the first time such an early temperature drop has been seen in a tidal disruption event. The transient resulting from the tidal disruption event has been cataloged as AT 2019ahk.

References

Black holes
Astronomical events
Volans (constellation)
2019 in space